Chamba may refer to:

People
Gilberto Chamba (born 1961), Ecuadorian serial killer
Jessica Chamba (born 1981), European activist

Places

Ghana
Chamba, a town in the Northern Region

India
Chamba (Vidhan Sabha constituency), Himachal Pradesh
Chamba, Himachal Pradesh, city in Himachal Pradesh
Chamba district, Himachal Pradesh
Chamba State, princely state
Chamba, Uttarakhand, small town in Tehri-Garhwal district, Uttarakhand

Iran
Chamba, Khuzestan, a village in Khuzestan Province
Chamba, Zanjan, a village in Zanjan Province

Pakistan
Chamba, Abbottabad, a village in the Khyber Pakhtunkhwa province
Chamba, Mansehra, a village in the Khyber-Pakhtunkhwa province

Other uses
Chamba language (disambiguation), several languages
Chamba people, ethnic group in Nigeria and Cameroon
Chamba goat, a Himalayan breed
:es:Chamba, a slang word used by some Spanish speaking people to denote "work"
Chamba or Malawi Gold, a popular strain of marijuana
Chambá, a local name for the medicinal plant Justicia pectoralis

See also
Chambas, a municipality and town in Ciego de Ávila Province, Cuba
Champa (disambiguation)
Chumba (disambiguation)
La Chamba, a commune in central France